145th meridian may refer to:

145th  meridian east, a line of longitude east of the Greenwich Meridian
145th meridian west, a line of longitude west of the Greenwich Meridian